The canton of Aiguilles is a former administrative division in southeastern France. It was disbanded following the French canton reorganisation which came into effect in March 2015. It consisted of 7 communes, which joined the canton of Guillestre in 2015. It had 2,145 inhabitants (2012).

The canton comprised the following communes:
Abriès
Aiguilles
Arvieux
Château-Ville-Vieille
Molines-en-Queyras
Ristolas
Saint-Véran

Demographics

See also
Cantons of the Hautes-Alpes department

References

Former cantons of Hautes-Alpes
2015 disestablishments in France
States and territories disestablished in 2015